Rhopalum is a genus of wasps in the family Crabronidae.

Species  
The genus Rhopalum contains 290 extant species:

Rhopalum acamas Leclercq, 2002
Rhopalum adamsi Leclercq, 2011
Rhopalum amamiinsulanum Terayama and Suda, 2015
Rhopalum ammaticum Leclercq, 1963
Rhopalum angulicolle Cameron, 1904
Rhopalum angustipetiolatum Tsuneki, 1971
Rhopalum annickae Leclercq, 1997
Rhopalum ansatum Leclercq, 2002
Rhopalum anteum Leclercq, 1957
Rhopalum antennatum Q. Li and He, 1998
Rhopalum antillarum Leclercq, 1957
Rhopalum anvillum Leclercq, 1997
Rhopalum ataiyal Tsuneki, 1982
Rhopalum atlanticum R. Bohart, 1974
Rhopalum aucklandi Leclercq, 1955
Rhopalum australiae Leclercq, 1957
Rhopalum austriacum (Kohl, 1899)
Rhopalum avexum Leclercq, 1963
Rhopalum avocetum Leclercq, 1997
Rhopalum babe Terayama, Tano, and Kurokawa, 2019
Rhopalum baguione Tsuneki, 1984
Rhopalum banosense Leclercq, 2002
Rhopalum barbatum Leclercq, 1997
Rhopalum beaumonti Móczár, 1957
Rhopalum bendorense Leclercq, 1997
Rhopalum bogotae Leclercq, 2002
Rhopalum bohartum Tsuneki, 1966
Rhopalum brachinense Leclercq, 1997
Rhopalum brevinodum (Spinola, 1851)
Rhopalum brontense Leclercq, 1997
Rhopalum bruchi Schrottky, 1909
Rhopalum bukidnon Tsuneki, 1984
Rhopalum cajanum Leclercq, 1970
Rhopalum calderoni Leclercq, 1970
Rhopalum caldux Leclercq, 2002
Rhopalum caliense Leclercq, 2002
Rhopalum calixtoides Leclercq, 1997
Rhopalum calixtum Leclercq, 1957
Rhopalum calverti (Pate, 1947)
Rhopalum calvitinum Leclercq, 2002
Rhopalum canberrae Leclercq, 1997
Rhopalum caniae Leclercq, 1997
Rhopalum canlaoni Leclercq, 1963
Rhopalum changi Tsuneki, 1968
Rhopalum cardaleae Leclercq, 1997
Rhopalum caripenne Leclercq, 2002
Rhopalum carnegiacum Leclercq, 1979
Rhopalum carrabinum Leclercq, 1997
Rhopalum categoricum Leclercq, 2002
Rhopalum caudinum Leclercq, 2002
Rhopalum cecropis Leclercq, 2002
Rhopalum chinchillae Leclercq, 1997
Rhopalum chinquense Leclercq, 1994
Rhopalum claudii (Janvier, 1928)
Rhopalum clavipes (Linnaeus, 1758)
Rhopalum claviventre (Cresson, 1865)
Rhopalum clonatum Leclercq, 2002
Rhopalum coarctatum (Scopoli, 1763)
Rhopalum cockleum Leclercq, 1997
Rhopalum collectum Leclercq, 1994
Rhopalum collessi Leclercq, 1997
Rhopalum coriolum Leclercq, 1957
Rhopalum cornicum Tsuneki, 1984
Rhopalum cornigerum Tsuneki, 1977
Rhopalum cornilabiatum Q. Li and He, 1999
Rhopalum crassinodum (Spinola, 1851)
Rhopalum creutzburgi H.-J. Jacobs, 2016
Rhopalum cruentatum (Arnold, 1944)
Rhopalum croisseti Leclercq, 2011
Rhopalum cumbayae Leclercq, 2002
Rhopalum curryi Leclercq, 1997
Rhopalum curtisi Leclercq, 1997
Rhopalum cygnorum R. Turner, 1915
Rhopalum decavum Leclercq, 1963
Rhopalum dedarum Leclercq, 1957
Rhopalum dellum Leclercq, 1997
Rhopalum dentiobliquum Q. Li and He, 1998
Rhopalum deroanni Leclercq, 2002
Rhopalum dineurum Leclercq, 1957
Rhopalum diopura (Pate, 1947)
Rhopalum distractum Leclercq, 1997
Rhopalum domesticum Williams, 1928
Rhopalum downiense Leclercq, 1997
Rhopalum drexum Leclercq, 1997
Rhopalum duclosi Leclercq, 2002
Rhopalum durangoense Leclercq, 2002
Rhopalum duratum Leclercq, 1997
Rhopalum emolitum Leclercq, 1997
Rhopalum encabbae Leclercq, 1997
Rhopalum erraticum Tsuneki, 1965
Rhopalum etiratum Leclercq, 1997
Rhopalum eucalypti R. Turner, 1915
Rhopalum euclanum Leclercq, 1997
Rhopalum eurytibiale Q. Li and Xue, 1998
Rhopalum eustonense Leclercq, 1997
Rhopalum evansianum Leclercq, 1979
Rhopalum evictum Leclercq, 1979
Rhopalum evocatum Leclercq, 1997
Rhopalum ewartense Leclercq, 1997
Rhopalum expeditionis Leclercq, 1955
Rhopalum exleyae Leclercq, 1997
Rhopalum extranum Leclercq, 2002
Rhopalum exultatum Leclercq, 1970
Rhopalum eyrense Leclercq, 1997
Rhopalum facetum Leclercq, 2002
Rhopalum famicum Leclercq, 1979
Rhopalum fannum Leclercq, 1997
Rhopalum farri Leclercq, 2002
Rhopalum faustum Leclercq, 2002
Rhopalum federale Leclercq, 2002
Rhopalum formosanum Tsuneki, 1966
Rhopalum fraxinum Leclercq, 1997
Rhopalum frenchii (R. Turner, 1908)
Rhopalum freturum Leclercq, 1997
Rhopalum frogatum Leclercq, 1997
Rhopalum futilum Leclercq, 1997
Rhopalum gansuense Q. Li and He, 1999
Rhopalum gauldi Leclercq, 1997
Rhopalum gloriosum Leclercq, 1997
Rhopalum gonopleurale Q. Li and Xue, 1998
Rhopalum gorongozae (Arnold, 1960)
Rhopalum gracile Wesmael, 1852
Rhopalum grahami Leclercq, 1957
Rhopalum gratorineum Leclercq, 1997
Rhopalum gratuitum Leclercq, 2002
Rhopalum grenadinum (Pate, 1947)
Rhopalum guttatum Tsuneki, 1955
Rhopalum hakodatense Tsuneki, 1960
Rhopalum hanedai Tsuneki, 1973
Rhopalum hannense Leclercq, 1997
Rhopalum hansoni Leclercq, 2002
Rhopalum harpax Leclercq, 1957
Rhopalum hawkerense Leclercq, 1997
Rhopalum hillorum Leclercq, 1963
Rhopalum hobartense Leclercq, 1997
Rhopalum hombceanum Tsuneki, 1973
Rhopalum huberi Leclercq, 2002
Rhopalum huilae Leclercq, 2002
Rhopalum ichneumoniforme (Arnold, 1927)
Rhopalum inopinum Leclercq, 1997
Rhopalum iridescens R. Turner, 1917
Rhopalum jamesoni Leclercq, 2002
Rhopalum jessonicum (Bischoff, 1921)
Rhopalum juventum Leclercq, 1997
Rhopalum juxtatum Leclercq, 1997
Rhopalum kawabatai Marshakov, 1976
Rhopalum kawense Leclercq, 2002
Rhopalum kedahense Leclercq, 1957
Rhopalum kerangi Leclercq, 1957
Rhopalum kovacsi Leclercq, 1994
Rhopalum kuehlhorni Leclercq, 1957
Rhopalum kuwayamai Tsuneki, 1952
Rhopalum kystum Leclercq, 1997
Rhopalum laticorne (Tsuneki, 1947)
Rhopalum latronum (Kohl, 1915)
Rhopalum littorale R. Turner, 1915
Rhopalum livanum Leclercq, 1997
Rhopalum lomae Leclercq, 2002
Rhopalum macasae Leclercq, 2002
Rhopalum macrocephalum R. Turner, 1915
Rhopalum masticatum Leclercq, 1997
Rhopalum matthewsi Leclercq, 1997
Rhopalum minusculum Leclercq, 1963
Rhopalum montanum (Alayo Dalmau, 1968)
Rhopalum mornense Leclercq, 2002
Rhopalum moronae Leclercq, 2002
Rhopalum mouranum Leclercq, 1997
Rhopalum murotai Tsuneki, 1973
Rhopalum musallae Leclercq, 2002
Rhopalum mushaense Tsuneki, 1971
Rhopalum mycenum Leclercq, 2002
Rhopalum nactor Leclercq, 2002
Rhopalum nahuelbutae Leclercq, 1994
Rhopalum nasale Pulawski, 2010
Rhopalum naumanni Leclercq, 1997
Rhopalum navatum Leclercq, 2002
Rhopalum neboissi Leclercq, 1957
Rhopalum negligens Leclercq, 2002
Rhopalum nemesis Leclercq, 2002
Rhopalum nicaraguaense Cameron, 1904
Rhopalum nifargum Leclercq, 2002
Rhopalum nipponicum (Kohl, 1915)
Rhopalum nordicum Leclercq, 1997
Rhopalum notogeum Leclercq, 1957
Rhopalum nuphar Leclercq, 2002
Rhopalum nursei H.-J. Jacob, 2016
Rhopalum nynganum Leclercq, 1997
Rhopalum obrieni Leclercq, 2011
Rhopalum occidentale (W. Fox, 1895)
Rhopalum odontodorsale Q. Li and He, 2000
Rhopalum okinawanum Tsuneki, 1990
Rhopalum oriolum Leclercq, 1957
Rhopalum ovale Tsuneki, 1984
Rhopalum pacificum R. Bohart, 1974
Rhopalum pallipes (Lepeletier de Saint Fargeau and Brullé, 1835)
Rhopalum palmarae Leclercq, 2002
Rhopalum panicum Leclercq, 1997
Rhopalum parcimonium Leclercq, 1963
Rhopalum pedicellatum Packard, 1867
Rhopalum penongum Leclercq, 1997
Rhopalum pepitum Leclercq, 1997
Rhopalum perforator F. Smith, 1876
Rhopalum peterseni Tsuneki, 1976
Rhopalum pichinchae Leclercq, 2002
Rhopalum piosense Leclercq, 1997
Rhopalum pitillae Leclercq, 2002
Rhopalum plaumanni Leclercq, 1970
Rhopalum poecilofemorale Q. Li and Xue, 1998
Rhopalum popayans Leclercq, 2002
Rhopalum potosium Leclercq, 1970
Rhopalum praenatum Leclercq, 2002
Rhopalum probolognathum Leclercq and Menke, 2000
Rhopalum pygidiale R. Bohart, 1976
Rhopalum quitense (Benoist, 1942)
Rhopalum rejectum Leclercq, 2012
Rhopalum rockyense Leclercq, 1997
Rhopalum rolotum Leclercq, 1970
Rhopalum rondeuxi Leclercq, 2002
Rhopalum rorator Leclercq, 2002
Rhopalum rossi Leclercq, 2002
Rhopalum rubigabdominale Q. Li and He, 2000
Rhopalum rufigaster Packard, 1867
Rhopalum rumipambae Leclercq, 1970
Rhopalum runcator Leclercq, 2002
Rhopalum ruppiatum Leclercq, 2002
Rhopalum ruptor Leclercq, 2012
Rhopalum rustulum Leclercq, 2002
Rhopalum rutans Leclercq, 2002
Rhopalum rutrax Leclercq, 2002
Rhopalum rutshuru Leclercq, 2012
Rhopalum rwankwi Leclercq, 2012
Rhopalum saccatum Leclercq, 2002
Rhopalum sandakanum Leclercq, 2011
Rhopalum sanluisi Leclercq, 2002
Rhopalum sauteri Tsuneki, 1977
Rhopalum schaffneri Leclercq, 2002
Rhopalum schlingeri Leclercq, 2002
Rhopalum seychellense R. Turner, 1911
Rhopalum shirozui Tsuneki, 1965
Rhopalum simalurense (Maidl, 1925)
Rhopalum sinaloae Leclercq, 2002
Rhopalum sinus Leclercq, 2002
Rhopalum smilax Leclercq, 2002
Rhopalum sobrina Leclercq, 2002
Rhopalum sonani Tsuneki, 1986
Rhopalum soroanum (Alayo Dalmau, 1968)
Rhopalum spinicollum Tsuneki, 1968
Rhopalum stationis Leclercq, 2002
Rhopalum stelmanni Leclercq, 1997
Rhopalum subtaeniatum Leclercq, 1997
Rhopalum succineicollare Tsuneki, 1952
Rhopalum sumatrae Leclercq, 1950
Rhopalum taeniatum Leclercq, 1957
Rhopalum taipingshanum Tsuneki, 1968
Rhopalum tayalum Tsuneki, 1966
Rhopalum tegulatum Leclercq, 1997
Rhopalum tenuiventre (R. Turner, 1908)
Rhopalum tepicum Leclercq, 1957
Rhopalum terzoi Leclercq, 2002
Rhopalum testaceum R. Turner, 1917
Rhopalum tingonum Leclercq, 2002
Rhopalum tongyaii Tsuneki, 1963
Rhopalum transiens (R. Turner, 1908)
Rhopalum tristani (Pate, 1947)
Rhopalum tsunekiense Leclercq, 1957
Rhopalum tsunekii Terayama and Murota, 2016
Rhopalum tubarum Leclercq, 1957
Rhopalum tuberculicorne R. Turner, 1917
Rhopalum tungurae Leclercq, 2002
Rhopalum urallae Leclercq, 1997
Rhopalum vallense Leclercq, 2002
Rhopalum varicoloratum Q. Li and He, 1998
Rhopalum variitarse R. Turner, 1915
Rhopalum venustum Tsuneki, 1955
Rhopalum verutum (Rayment, 1932)
Rhopalum vicosae Leclercq, 2002
Rhopalum vincenti Leclercq, 2002
Rhopalum volcani Leclercq, 2002
Rhopalum watanabei Tsuneki, 1952
Rhopalum weipanum Leclercq, 1997
Rhopalum wileyi Leclercq, 2002
Rhopalum wonvillei Leclercq, 1997
Rhopalum wusheense Tsuneki, 1973
Rhopalum xenum Leclercq, 1957
Rhopalum xinjangense Q. Li and Xue, 1998
Rhopalum yallingupae Leclercq, 1997
Rhopalum yercaudi Leclercq, 1963
Rhopalum zamorae Leclercq, 2002
Rhopalum zethus Leclercq, 2002
Rhopalum zelandum Leclercq, 1955

References

External links

Rhopalum images at  Consortium for the Barcode of Life

Crabronidae
Hymenoptera of Africa
Hymenoptera of New Zealand